1º (meaning first in Italian, Portuguese, and Spanish) may refer to:
1º Batalhão de Forcas Especiais
1º de Agosto, or C.D. Primeiro de Agosto
1º de Maio
1º de Mayo (Seville Metro)
Associação Naval 1º de Maio
1º Compañía de Comandos "Iquique"
Sesto 1º Maggio (Milan Metro)
S.U. 1º de Dezembro
Estádio 1º de Maio, see Estádio Primeiro de Maio
1º Pelotão de Defesa Química, Biológica e Nuclear (1º Pel DQBN)